UWC Robert Bosch College in Freiburg, Germany, is among the newest members of the United World Colleges (UWC) movement, one of eighteen colleges around the world, having started accepting students in September 2014. The mission of the UWC movement and of the school is to "make education a force to unite people, nations and cultures for peace and a sustainable future". The college follows the International Baccalaureate (IB) curriculum, covering the two final years of high school.

The student body of around 200 students is selected by over 140 national committees worldwide, who review the applications and invite students for interviews and/or selection weekends. Each year group consists of about 100 students, with about 25% from Germany and 75 from other countries. The international student body consists of around 90 nationalities, with a diversity of religious and socio-economic backgrounds. Thanks to a wide network of sponsors and supporters and a need-based scholarship program, the national committees can select students irrespective of the financial situation of their parents. At UWC Robert Bosch College, over 70% of the students receive a full scholarship, while the rest are on partial scholarships or self-funded.

The college's fully residential campus is located on the newly refurbished Freiburg Charterhouse, a former Carthusian monastery dating to the 14th century. The students are housed in newly built and cube-shaped student houses, which were designed by architect Peter Kulka and follow Freiburg's energy-efficient standards. The houses are sustainable and are powered by energy from solar panels. The student village consists of eight houses for students and four houses for teachers. The student houses house around 24 people. All houses are equipped with kitchens with common supplies, living room with tables, 4 bathrooms and a storage room.

The school is named after German industrialist Robert Bosch, founder of the Robert Bosch GmbH. The company and the Robert Bosch Stiftung foundation contributed around 45 million Euros to the project. Together with Deutsche Stiftung UWC, the Robert Bosch Stiftung is a big shareholder of the school. Additional significant support comes from Land Baden-Württemberg, B. Braun Melsungen AG, Stadt Freiburg, Adelhausenstiftung Freiburg, the Eugen-Martin-Stiftung as well as many other individual sponsors.

The school places a particular emphasis on environmental issues. As part of the school's educational program, students are grapple with how technology can contribute to sustainable development and peace".

References

External links 
  Official Site
 United World College Deutschland Website
 UWC Robert Bosch College Facebook page
 UWC Robert Bosch College Instagram page
 UWC Robert Bosch College YouTube channel

Schools in Freiburg im Breisgau
United World Colleges
Private schools in Germany
High schools in Germany
Boarding schools in Germany
International Baccalaureate schools in Germany
Educational institutions established in 2012
2012 establishments in Germany